Copyzero is a mechanism of protection of works by means of a qualified digital signature and a time mark. This mechanism lies in converting the work into digital format and appending the digital signature (which characterizes the author of the work) and a time mark (which indicates the existence of the work since given time) to the file.

In the Italian legal system, the digital signature has the same probative value as a certificate of SIAE (Società Italiana degli Autori ed Editori, Italian society of authors and publishers) but a cost much smaller (0,36 Euro, cost of one time mark, rather than corresponding 110 euro for renewal of the certificate every 5 years).

The duration of a time mark is 4 years: in order to extend the period of validity it is sufficient to append a new time mark to the marked file before the old time mark expires. However, the expired mark can be rightfully used in a court ruling up to 10 years from the date it was appended.

The instruments used by Copyzero are the device of a qualified digital signature (a smart card obtainable at certification authorities like e.g. the Chamber of Commerce) and the corresponding reader (for sale at computer stores).

Sources 
Translation of the Copyzero article at the Italian Wikipedia.

External links 
COMPUTERLAW 
Punto Informatico 
Zeus News 
DIGIMAG 
COPYZERO 

Copyright law